William Laurence Bingham  (5 August 1931 – 9 June 2022) was a Northern Ireland international footballer and football manager.

As a player, his first professional club was Glentoran, whom he played for between 1948 and 1950. Making the move to England, he then spent eight years with Sunderland, making 227 appearances. In 1958 he switched to Luton Town, making close to 100 league appearances in a three-year spell. This was followed by a two-year association with Everton, where he again went close to 100 league appearances. He finished his career after breaking his leg in a match for Port Vale in 1964, at the age of 33. He had scored 133 goals in 525 appearances in all domestic competitions. Between 1951 and 1963, he won 56 caps for Northern Ireland, scoring 10 international goals, and played at the 1958 FIFA World Cup.

His managerial career started at Southport in 1965. He was appointed manager of Northern Ireland two years later, after taking the "Sandgrounders" to promotion out of the Fourth Division. During his time as an international manager he also took charge at Plymouth Argyle, and later Linfield. He led Linfield to a quadruple in 1970–71, his only season in charge. In 1971, he was appointed the head coach of the Greece national side. Two years later he returned to the domestic game with Everton of England. He returned to Greece for a brief spell in 1977, taking the reins at PAOK. The following year he went back to England to take charge of Mansfield Town for one full season. In 1980, he was re-appointed Northern Ireland manager, his final position, and a post he would hold for the next thirteen years. He led his nation to the finals of the FIFA World Cup in 1982 and 1986.

Playing career

Club career

Glentoran
Bingham attended Elmgrove Primary School, and was captain of the school's football team, also being selected for Northern Ireland schoolboy games. Born in the Bloomfield area of Belfast, he grew up alongside Jackie Blanchflower. He began his career with Glentoran on £6-a-week. He made his senior debut on 12 March 1949, in a 1–1 draw with Ballymena United. The "Glens" finished second in the Irish League in 1949–50. While with Glentoran, Bingham also made two appearances for the Irish League representative team.

Sunderland
Bingham joined Sunderland in October 1950 for £10,000. In addition to playing professional football at Roker Park, Bingham continued his shipbuilding apprenticeship on the Sunderland shipyards. His speed and ball-control made him a popular player with the "Black Cats", and he gradually worked his way into Bill Murray's first team plans in 1950–51. He established himself as the first choice outside-right in 1951–52, however he lost his place to Tommy Wright in 1952–53. He made just 19 appearances in 1953–54, as Wright continued to hold on to his first team place. Bingham regained his place in 1954–55, scoring ten goals in 42 games, as Sunderland finished fourth in the First Division, four points behind champions Chelsea. They also reached the semi-finals of the FA Cup, where they lost to Manchester City at Villa Park. They slipped to ninth in 1955–56, and again exited the FA Cup at the semi-finals, this time losing 3–0 to Birmingham City. The 1956–57 campaign started poorly, and Bingham was dropped in October; he put in a transfer request, which was turned down. New boss Alan Brown signed outside-right Amby Fogarty from Glentoran, and led the club to relegation in 1957–58. Out of the first team, Bingham fell out with Brown, and left the club in the summer on a £8,000 transfer to top-flight Luton Town. In total he made 227 appearances and scored 47 goals during his time in the North East.

Luton Town
The "Hatters" finished 17th in the league in 1958–59, but reached the 1959 FA Cup Final after Bingham scored the winning goal in the semi-final clash with Norwich City. In the Wembley final, his corner set up Dave Pacey for Luton's consolation in a 2–1 defeat to Nottingham Forest. Despite Bingham scoring 16 league goals to become the club's top scorer, Luton were relegated under Syd Owen in 1959–60. New manager Sam Bartram failed to keep Bingham at Kenilworth Road for long, and after three goals in 11 Second Division games, including a 35-yard volley against Liverpool at Anfield, he soon attracted attention from Everton and Arsenal.

Everton
He joined Everton for a fee of £15,000 in October 1960. Signed by Johnny Carey, Harry Catterick took charge at Goodison Park following a fifth-place finish in 1960–61. A fourth-place finish followed in 1961–62, and the "Toffees" won the league title in 1962–63. However Catterick signed Scotsman Alex Scott in February 1963 for £40,000, and so Bingham's days at Merseyside were numbered. During his time at Everton, he made 98 appearances and scored 26 goals.

Port Vale
Bingham joined Port Vale for a then joint-club record fee of £15,000 in August 1963. He scored seven goals in 38 appearances in 1963–64, as Freddie Steele's "Valiants" finished 13th in the Third Division. Johnny Carey, now manager at Nottingham Forest, offered £12,000 to take Bingham back into the top-flight, but he elected to remain at Vale Park. He retired from playing after breaking his leg in a 4–0 defeat at Brentford on 5 September 1964. He left for Southport on a free transfer in April 1965 to become their trainer-coach.

International career
He was a Northern Ireland international, having won his first cap against France as a 19-year-old. Manager Peter Doherty selected him to compete in the 1958 FIFA World Cup in Sweden. This was after Bingham had scored against Portugal in Lisbon to help his country win a qualification place at the expense of Portugal and Italy. In the tournament itself, Northern Ireland beat Czechoslovakia and drew with West Germany, before beating Czechoslovakia again in a play-off match to advance into the quarter finals, where they lost 4–0 to France. He was awarded a total of 56 full caps, a record at the time, and also scored 10 goals, half of which were scored in British Home Championship matches against Scotland.

Style of play
Bingham played at outside-right and had excellent tactical and positional skills, as well as good scoring ability.

Managerial career

Southport
Bingham became a coach at Southport in June 1965, and was appointed manager at the end of the year, at the expense of Willie Cunningham. He led the team to a tenth-place finish in the Fourth Division in 1965–66. In his first full season in charge, 1966–67, he led the "Sandgrounders" to promotion as runners-up – the club's first ever promotion. He departed Haig Avenue in October 1967, with Southport in safe hands as they finished the 1967–68 Third Division campaign in 13th place under Don McEvoy's stewardship.

Northern Ireland, Plymouth & Linfield
He left Southport to take charge of the Northern Ireland national team in October 1967. The position was not a taxing one however, and Bingham took charge at Plymouth Argyle in February 1968, replacing Derek Ufton. He was unable to steer the club away from relegation, as the "Pilgrims" finished bottom of the Second Division. He took the club to fifth in the third tier in 1968–69, some 15 points behind second placed Swindon Town. A battle against relegation followed in 1969–70, and Bingham departed Home Park in March 1970; the club went on to finish 17th under Ellis Stuttard's stewardship. Still Northern Ireland's boss, he took charge of the country's biggest club, Linfield, in August 1970. His one season at Windsor Park was highly successful, as he led the "Blues" to the 1970–71 Irish League title, three points ahead of rivals Glentoran. The club also lifted a treble of trophies, in the form of the Ulster Cup, Gold Cup, and Blaxnit Cup. He stood down as "Norn Iron" boss in May 1971, and left Linfield as well in August. During his time as coach of the national team, Northern Ireland played 20 games, winning eight, drawing three and losing nine games. They had missed out on qualification to the 1970 FIFA World Cup after losing to the Soviet Union in Moscow. In the British Home Championship tournaments, they finished third in 1969, fourth in 1970, and second in 1971.

Greece
Bingham took charge of the Greece national side in September 1971, replacing Lakis Petropoulos. The Greeks lost 2–0 to England at the Karaiskakis Stadium on 1 December, Geoff Hurst and Martin Chivers the scorers, to ensure English qualification to Euro 1972. He left his post in February 1973 after two defeats to Spain meant Greece failed to qualify for the 1974 FIFA World Cup.

AEK Athens
Immediately after his departure from Greece, Bingham took charge at AEK Athens, who were then looking for a replacement of Branko Stanković. He stayed at the club for three months before he was sacked due to the bad results that kept the club out of the spots that lead to next season's European competitions.

Everton
Bingham returned to English football when he took over as manager at Everton in May 1973, replacing Harry Catterick. Signing players such as Martin Dobson and Bob Latchford, he led the "Toffees" to seventh in the First Division in 1973–74, two points off a place in the UEFA Cup. Everton seemed likely to win the title again in 1974–75, but only won once in the last five games to finish a disappointing fourth, three points behind champions Derby County. In 1975–76 Everton finished eleventh, as a period of decline set in at Goodison Park. A run of eight league games without a win resulted in Bingham being sacked in January 1977; the club went on to finish 1976–77 in ninth place under Gordon Lee's stewardship, and also finish as runners-up in the League Cup final and FA Cup semi-finalists.

PAOK & Mansfield
Bingham returned to Greece in April 1977, taking charge at PAOK at Branko Stanković's expense. He lasted just six months in the job however, before being replaced by Lakis Petropoulos, who led the club to a second-place finish in Alpha Ethniki in 1977–78. He then took charge at Mansfield Town in February 1978, replacing Peter Morris. He could not prevent the "Stags" from suffering relegation out of the Second Division at the end of 1977–78. The 1978–79 season would be his last as a club manager, and he led Mansfield to 18th in the Third Division, before he left Field Mill in the summer.

Northern Ireland (second spell)
Bingham was appointed manager of Northern Ireland for a second time in March 1980, and it would be in this second spell that his managerial career would be best remembered. He led the nation to victory in the British Home Championship in 1980, only the nation's second outright victory in 96 years, as they beat both Scotland and Wales, whilst holding England to a draw. However they only managed a point in 1982. He led Northern Ireland to the 1982 FIFA World Cup, after qualifying, along with Scotland, with unlikely victories over Sweden, Portugal, and Israel. In the tournament itself, despite a limited squad with only a few genuine world class players at his disposal (goalkeeper Pat Jennings, captain Martin O'Neill, and 17-year-old Norman Whiteside), Bingham's team stunned the host nation, Spain with a 1–0 victory at the Mestalla Stadium. Their draws with Honduras and Yugoslavia meant they shocked the world by finishing top of their group with only two goals from Gerry Armstrong. They exited at the Second Round with a 2–2 draw with Austria and a 4–1 defeat to France.

He led Northern Ireland to third in the British Home Championship in 1983, before they won the last ever edition of the tournament in 1984 with a 2–0 win over the Scots. However Northern Ireland failed in qualifying for UEFA Euro 1984, despite winning their group games 1–0 over West Germany both at Belfast and at the Volksparkstadion. They were ten minutes away from qualification, when in the final group game, Germany's Gerhard Strack hit a winner past Albania to claim the only qualification spot in the group for the Germans; they finished ahead of Northern Ireland on goal difference.

Bingham proved that 1982 was no fluke after he led the nation to the 1986 FIFA World Cup. They qualified, along with England, after beating Romania, Finland, and Turkey to claim second spot in their group. They faced an insurmountable challenge however in Brazil and Spain, and exited the tournament with only a point against Algeria. He also coached Al-Nassr in the Saudi Professional League during the 1987–88 season, and led the club to their fifth Kings Cup title in 1987.

The retirements of O'Neill, Jennings and Whiteside (the latter due to injury) robbed Bingham of his best players. Northern Ireland failed to reach the 1990 and 1994 finals, and he stepped down in November 1993. The final game of the 1994 World Cup qualification campaign was against Republic of Ireland, and was to be marred with sectarianism and controversy. Bingham's men set out to deny the Irish the point they needed to secure qualification ahead of Denmark, with Northern Ireland unable to qualify. Jimmy Quinn's strike was cancelled out by a late Irish equaliser, and after the game there was an ugly exchange between Bingham and Ireland manager, Jack Charlton. Both 1990 and 1994 qualification groups ended with Spain and the Republic qualifying, with Northern Ireland finishing some distance short of the mark.

Bingham later served Blackpool as director of football. In May 2008 he came out of retirement to become a talent spotter in Ireland for Burnley.

Personal and later life
Bingham was appointed a Member of the Order of the British Empire (MBE) for services to football in the 1981 Birthday Honours. He was married and divorced twice, and had a son and daughter from his first marriage.

He was diagnosed with dementia in 2006, and died at a care home in Southport on 9 June 2022, aged 90.

Career statistics

Club

International

Scores and results list Northern Ireland's goal tally first, score column indicates score after each Bingham goal.

Managerial

Awards and honours

As player
Luton Town
FA Cup runner-up: 1959

Everton
Football League First Division: 1962–63

As manager
Southport
Football League Fourth Division second-place promotion: 1966–67

Linfield
Irish League: 1970–71
Ulster Cup: 1971
Gold Cup: 1971
Blaxnit Cup: 1971

Northern Ireland
British Home Championship: 1980, 1984

Al-Nassr
Kings Cup: 1987

References

1931 births
2022 deaths
Association footballers from Belfast
Association footballers from Northern Ireland
Northern Ireland international footballers
League of Ireland XI players
Everton F.C. managers
Association football forwards
Glentoran F.C. players
Sunderland A.F.C. players
Luton Town F.C. players
Port Vale F.C. players
NIFL Premiership players
English Football League players
1958 FIFA World Cup players
Football managers from Northern Ireland
Southport F.C. managers
Northern Ireland national football team managers
Plymouth Argyle F.C. managers
Linfield F.C. managers
Expatriate association footballers from Northern Ireland
British expatriates in Greece
Expatriate football managers in Greece
Greece national football team managers
AEK Athens F.C. managers
Everton F.C. players
PAOK FC managers
Mansfield Town F.C. managers
Expatriate football managers from Northern Ireland
Expatriate football managers in Saudi Arabia
Al Nassr FC managers
English Football League managers
1982 FIFA World Cup managers
1986 FIFA World Cup managers
Association football coaches
Blackpool F.C. non-playing staff
Members of the Order of the British Empire
FA Cup Final players
Association football scouts
Deaths from dementia in England